Walter Leonard Flager (November 3, 1921 – December 16, 1990) was a professional baseball player.  He was a shortstop for one season (1945) with the Cincinnati Reds and Philadelphia Phillies.  For his career, he compiled a .241 batting average in 220 at-bats, with two home runs and 21 runs batted in.

He was born in Chicago Heights, Illinois and attended Bloom High School there. Flager died in Keizer, Oregon at the age of 69.

External links

1921 births
1990 deaths
Cincinnati Reds players
Philadelphia Phillies players
Major League Baseball shortstops
Baseball players from Illinois
Columbia Reds players
Birmingham Barons players
Salem Senators players
Shreveport Sports players
Portland Beavers players
Fresno Cardinals players
People from Keizer, Oregon
People from Chicago Heights, Illinois
Sportspeople from the Chicago metropolitan area
Baseball players from Oregon
Lenoir Red Sox players